Wilhelm Anton Georg Dreesen (31 March 1840, Rendsburg – 18 December 1926, Flensburg) was a German-Danish photographer. He was involved with the Künstlerkolonie Ekensund. Many of his works were lost in the bombing of Hamburg during World War II.

Bibliography
 .
 Jürgen Jensen: Die Entdeckung von Heide und Moor um die Jahrhundertwende. Land und Leute zwischen Elbe und Aller, Weser und Jeetze auf Fotos von Wilhelm Dreesen. Karl Wachholtz Verlag, Neumünster 1984, .
 Wilhelm Dreesen: Ulrich Schulte-Wülwer, Künstlerkolonie Ekensund, Heide 2000, S. 93–99.

External links

References 

19th-century German photographers
19th-century Danish photographers
1840 births
1926 deaths
People from Rendsburg
Photographers from Schleswig-Holstein